Tong Sala is the principal town and administrative centre of Ko Pha Ngan, an island in the Gulf of Thailand. While Haad Rin hosts the Full Moon Party and attracts many of the island's visitors, Thong Sala is mostly used by tourists as a ferry terminal and jumping off point.

The port area has three main piers, one of which is able to handle medium- to large-sized container and passenger craft. The others accommodate smaller passenger and dive boats that serve the islands of Ko Pha Ngan, Ko Samui, and Ko Tao, and the mainland ports of Surat Thani and Chumphon.

References

External links 

Populated places in Surat Thani province